Jean-Pierre Blanc (23 April 1942 – 21 May 2004) was a French film director and screenwriter. He directed six films between 1972 and 1993. He won the Silver Bear for Best Director at the 22nd Berlin International Film Festival for La Vieille Fille.

Filmography
 La Vieille Fille (1972)
 Un ange au paradis (1973)
 D'amour et d'eau fraîche (1976)
 Le devoir de français (1978)
  (1979)
 Caravane (1993)

References

External links

1942 births
2004 deaths
French film directors
French male screenwriters
20th-century French screenwriters
Silver Bear for Best Director recipients
20th-century French male writers